Master corporal (MCpl) is a military rank used by a number of countries including the Canadian Armed Forces.

Canada

In the Canadian Armed Forces the rank of master corporal is an appointment of the rank of Corporal in the Canadian Army and Royal Canadian Air Force, however in the Royal Canadian Army Cadets it is instead known as a rank. Its Naval equivalent is master sailor (MS) ( or matc).

According to the Queen's Regulations and Orders: 
(1) The Chief of the Defence Staff or such officer as he may designate may appoint a corporal as a master corporal. 
(2) The rank of a master corporal remains that of corporal. 
(3) Master corporals have seniority among themselves in their order of seniority as corporals. 
(4) Master corporals have authority and powers of command over all other corporals."

Master corporal, while formally an appointment, is treated as a de facto non-commissioned member rank, and is often described as such, even in official documents.

As mentioned above, the master corporal is senior to the corporal (and its naval counterpart, Sailor 1st Class (S1)). It is junior to the rank of sergeant (Sgt) and its equivalent naval rank, petty officer 2nd class (PO2). Master corporals and master sailors together with corporals and sailors 1st class make up the cadre of junior non-commissioned officers. 

The rank insignia of a master corporal is a 2-bar chevron, worn point down, surmounted by a maple leaf. Embroidered rank badges are worn in "CF gold" thread on rifle green (Army) melton, or in silver on Air Force blue (Air Force) melton, stitched to the upper sleeves of the Service Dress jacket; as miniature gold metal and rifle-green enamel badges on the collars of the Army dress shirt and Army outerwear jackets; in "old-gold" thread on Air Force blue slip-ons on Air Force shirts, sweaters, and coats; and in white (Army) or dark blue (Air Force) thread on CADPAT slip-ons on the Operational Dress uniform. Insignia for mess kit is determined by branch or regimental tradition.

Master corporals normally mess and billet with the Junior Ranks. Within most Canadian Army units, master corporals are commonly nicknamed "master jack" or "jack" by both superiors and subordinates. The nickname is derived from the former equivalent rank of Lance Corporal,(which still is a rank in use with the Royal Canadian Army Cadets.) or "Lance Jack". This is an informality and is only used within social context and never in formal proceedings. In general, only in closer working or socially comfortable units like rifle regiments or infantry units is this informal term commonly used. Master corporals are also frequently referred to as "chef" in Quebec, a reference to the French translation of the rank, caporal-chef; which has also caused the term "Chief" to be used by Quebec Anglophone military members.

History
The Master Corporal appointment came into existence after the unification of the Canadian Forces in the mid 60s. A power vacuum was inadvertently created when private soldiers were promoted to the rank of corporal as an incentive for continuing in the Forces at a time when Unification was introduced by Defence Minister Hellyer, who promoted all privates with requisite time in service to what was originally a leadership rank (corporal) in the Army.   Eventually, corporals who had passed the "B" phase of their leadership training took to wearing a crown over their chevrons, and this arrangement was eventually formalized by having a maple leaf replace the crown, and the new "'B' Corporals", as they were known, became Master Corporals.

Responsibilities
The rank, formally an appointment as a senior corporal, gives the MCpl authority over all privates and corporals.  As such, a MCpl is a first level supervisor who will be assessed on his/her ability to manage and develop subordinates.  Given the structure of the Canadian infantry platoon, the MCpl is roughly equivalent to the British rank of Corporal, second in command of an infantry section; due to the fact that MCpls often command sections and occupy various NCO position, as well as the fact that trained leadership is retained at a lower level (section) than in other militaries, it is more realistic to equate MCpls with the British, Australian and New Zealand rank of senior Corporal and just under Sergeant.

Requirements
The general requirements for promotion to Master Corporal include a Qualification Level 5 course (known as a Journeyman course in some trades), a primary leadership qualification course (PLQ), and a time in the rank of Corporal for a minimum of two years. For combat arms trades (except for the infantry), an Army Junior Leadership Course (AJLC) is also required.  

However, certain trades have their own particular qualifications in addition to the above.  For example, infantry combines the Qualification Level 5B course, Qualification Level 6A, and Junior Leader's course in a single Infantry Section Commander's Course.  In addition, in order to be promoted to Master corporal an infantry soldier must have successfully completed a machine gunner's specialization course.

Master corporals often serve as Training Non-Commissioned Officers for the purposes of training new soldiers.  They are often a new recruit's first taste of military life.

French speaking nations

France

Other nations

Indonesia

In the Indonesian Military, the rank "Master Corporal" is known as Kopral Kepala (Kopka). In Indonesia, "Corporal" has three levels, which are: Second Corporal (Lance Corporal), First Corporal (Corporal), and Master Corporal.

See also
Canadian Armed Forces ranks and insignia

References

Military appointments of Canada
Military ranks of Canada